GT Racer is a Cinéma vérité television program following classic car racing. In the United Kingdom it is broadcast on the UKTV channel Dave, in the United States it is broadcast by Treasure HD, a high definition channel of VoomHD and can be received on 'Cable Vision' and 'Dish'. The series is produced and directed by Alexander Davidis through John Galt Films, Inc. In 2008 the program has been picked up by Discovery HD that will air Season II as of March 2009. In the US the program can then be seen on HD Theater and world wide on Discovery HD. It is distributed on DVD by Spirit Level Film.

Program Content
GT Racer is taking the viewer inside the cars and onto the tracks. Some of the cars featured include 1950s and 60s Aston Martins, Ferraris, Maseratis, Porsches, Mustangs and Cobras racing at events such as the historic ‘Grand Prix O-Porto’ (Portugal), Silverstone Classic at Silverstone Circuit (UK), the Oldtimer Grand Prix at the Nürburgring, (Germany), or the Monterey Historic Races at Mazda Raceway Laguna Seca, Monterey, the Vintage Festival at Lime Rock (USA) or the Six Hours of Spa (Belgium). Season II will feature the biannual Le Mans Classic (France), the Marathon 500 on Nürburgring's Nordschleife (Germany), the Gentleman Drivers Meeting at Magny-Cours, (France) and the 3200 km road-race La Carrera Panamericana through entire Mexico.

The show follows a handful of racers, their teams and their cars. Throughout the program there are interviews with drivers and mechanics. Small HDTV cameras are used on board to record during the entire race.

External links
 GT Racer Website
 GT Racer on UKTV channel Dave
 Director Alexander Davidis
 TV Guide Rating and Comments 
 Editorial

Automotive television series
Dave (TV channel) original programming